Heinrich Glarean also styled Glareanus (born as Heinrich Loriti on 28 February or 3 June 1488 – 28 March 1563) was a Swiss music theorist, poet and humanist. He was born in Mollis (in the canton of Glarus, hence his name) and died in Freiburg im Breisgau.

Biography
Glarean was born as Heinrich Loriti in Mollis in Canton Glarus to a politician. As a boy, he took care of cattle and received a good education. After a thorough early training in music, Glarean enrolled in the University of Cologne, where he studied theology, philosophy, and mathematics as well as music. It was in Cologne where he held a poem as a tribute to Emperor Maximilian I. Since 1514 he was a teacher for Greek and Latin in Basel, where he met Erasmus and the two humanists became lifelong friends. He shortly was a lecturer at the University of Pavia for a few months in 1515, but returned to Basel due to the Battle of Marignano between Switzerland and France.  

Glarean's first publication on music, a modest volume entitled Isagoge in musicen, was printed in 1515 by Johann Froben. In it he discusses the basic elements of music; probably it was used for teaching. In late 1515 a treatise on latin poetry of him was printed by Adam Petri. But his most famous book, and one of the most famous and influential works on music theory written during the Renaissance, was the Dodecachordon, which he published in Basle in 1547. This massive work includes writings on philosophy and biography in addition to music theory, and includes no less than 120 complete compositions by composers of the preceding generation (including Josquin, Ockeghem, Obrecht, Isaac and many others). In three parts, it begins with a study of Boethius, who wrote extensively on music in the sixth century; it traces the use of the musical modes in plainsong (e.g. Gregorian chant) and monophony; and it closes with an extended study of the use of modes in polyphony.

The most significant feature of the Dodecachordon (literally, "12-stringed instrument") is Glarean's proposal that there are actually twelve modes, not eight, as had long been assumed, for instance in the works of the contemporary theorist Pietro Aron. The additional four modes included authentic and plagal forms of Aeolian (modes 9 and 10) and Ionian (modes 11 and 12) — the modes equivalent to minor and major scales, respectively. Glarean went so far as to say that the Ionian mode was the one most frequently used by composers in his day.

The influence of his work was immense. Many later theorists, including Zarlino, accepted the twelve modes, and though the distinction between plagal and authentic forms of the modes is no longer of contemporary interest (reducing the number from twelve to six), Glarean's explanation of the musical modes remains current today.

Notes

References

Further reading
 Iain Fenlon and Inga Mai Groote (eds.). Heinrich Glarean's Books: The Intellectual World of a Sixteenth-Century Musical Humanist, Cambridge and New York: Cambridge University Press, 2013. .
 Henricus Glareanus. Dodecachordon Basel: Heinrich Petri, 1547 (facsimile, accessed 30 December 2015).
 Otto Hartig. "Henry Glarean", Catholic Encyclopedia. New York: Robert Appleton Company, 1913.
 Gustave Reese. Music in the Renaissance. New York, W.W. Norton & Co., 1954. .
 Oliver Strunk. Source Readings in Music History. New York, W.W. Norton & Co., 1950.

External links 
A source of the "Dodekachordon"

1488 births
1563 deaths
People from the canton of Glarus
Swiss Renaissance humanists
Swiss music theorists
Swiss male poets
Josquin scholars